Man In The Machine is the debut album released by British band Royworld in 2008. It contains the limited release 7" songs "Elasticity" and "Man In The Machine", as well as the UK hit single Dust.

Track listing
Elasticity
Dust
Wish Ourselves Away
Brakes
Back of My Mind
Science
Transmission
Man in the Machine
Astronaut
Same Sun
Brother
Tinman

External links
Album details on Amazon

2008 albums
Royworld albums